Sydney Ann Cummings (born 5 March 1999) is an American-born Guyanese footballer who plays as a defender for the Guyana women's national team, and for Western United of the A-League Women.

Club career
Cummings was selected 42nd overall by Racing Louisville FC in the 2022 NWSL Draft, but did not sign with the team.

San Diego Wave
San Diego Wave of the National Women's Soccer League signed Cummings as a national team replacement player on July 1, 2022.

Western United
In September 2022, Cummings joined A-League Women expansion club Western United as their 4th and final international player.

International goals
Scores and results list Guyana's goal tally first

See also
List of Guyana women's international footballers

References

External links

San Diego Wave FC profile

1999 births
Living people
Citizens of Guyana through descent
Guyanese women's footballers
Women's association football defenders
Guyana women's international footballers
People from Millstone Township, New Jersey
Sportspeople from Monmouth County, New Jersey
Soccer players from New Jersey
American women's soccer players
St. John Vianney High School (New Jersey) alumni
Brown Bears women's soccer players
American sportspeople of Guyanese descent
Georgetown Hoyas women's soccer players
Racing Louisville FC draft picks
San Diego Wave FC players
Western United FC (A-League Women) players